Carbohydrate-deficient transferrin (CDT, also known as desialotransferrin or asialotransferrin) is a laboratory test used to help detect heavy ethanol consumption.

Physiology
Transferrin is a serum protein that carries iron through the bloodstream to the bone marrow, where red blood cells are manufactured, as well as to the liver and spleen. Structurally, transferrin is a polypeptide with two N-linked polysaccharide chains. These polysaccharide chains are branched with sialic acid residues.  Sialic acid is a monosaccharide carbohydrate.

Various forms of transferrin exist, with differing levels of sialylation.  The most common form is tetrasialotransferrin, with four sialic acid chains.  In persons who consume significant quantities of alcohol (usually more than 4 or 5 alcoholic beverages a day for two weeks or more) , the proportion of transferrin with zero, one, or two sialic acid chains is increased.  These are referred to as carbohydrate-deficient transferrins.  These carbohydrate-deficient transferrins can be measured in the bloodstream, and are important markers for alcohol use disorder.

Test for alcohol consumption
Carbohydrate-deficient transferrin is elevated in the blood of people with heavy alcohol consumption but elevated levels can also be found in a number of medical conditions. The limitations of the assay depend upon the methodology of the test. HPLC (High Performance Liquid Chromatography) can detect certain genetic variants and potential liver diseases affecting CDT.

Used with other tests, such as gamma glutamyl transferase (GGT), aspartate aminotransferase (AST), and alanine aminotransferase (ALT), carbohydrate-deficient transferrin can be a useful tool in identifying problem drinking, such as alcohol use disorder. However, it is less sensitive than phosphatidylethanol (PEth) in detecting current regular alcohol consumption. The ethanol conjugates ethyl glucuronide and ethyl sulfate remain positive for up to three days after ethanol consumption and are quite useful for detection of occult/denied alcohol use disorder.  Both these substances are detectable clinically through urine drug testing by commercial toxicology labs.  

CDT is measured by taking a sample of a patient's blood. Apparently healthy individuals with no or low reported alcohol consumption and a negative Alcohol Use Disorders Identification Test (AUDIT) will have a %CDT <1.7% (95th percentile for the social drinking population). Elevated levels of CDT suggest recent heavy alcohol consumption, especially if other liver-associated enzymes (such as GGT) are elevated. Although recent heavy alcohol use is most commonly associated with elevated CDT, certain rare liver disorders can also increase levels of CDT. CDT levels are less useful for detecting alcohol use disorder in people with other liver diseases.

References

Chemical pathology
Transferrins